Randy Angst is an American politician who served in the Missouri House of Representatives, representing District 146 from 2003 to 2004. A member of the Republican Party, Angst was a 2012 candidate for District 129 of the Missouri House of Representatives.

Personal life
Angst graduated from Conway High School in Conway, MO in 1975 and attended Southwest Missouri State University. He and his family live just outside of Lebanon, MO and own and operate Bailey's TV. They are also active members of the First Baptist Church of Lebanon.

Committees

2003-2004
While in the Missouri House of Representatives, Angst served on the following committees: 
 Small Business, Vice-Chair
 Homeland Security and Veterans Affairs
 Local Government
 Communications, Energy, and Technology

References

Republican Party members of the Missouri House of Representatives
Living people
Missouri State University alumni
Year of birth missing (living people)